Omer Victor Simeon (July 21, 1902 – September 17, 1959) was an American jazz clarinetist. He also played soprano, alto, and baritone saxophone and bass clarinet.

Biography
The son of a cigar maker, Omer Simeon was born in New Orleans, Louisiana, United States. His family moved to Chicago, Illinois. He learned clarinet from the New Orleans musician Lorenzo Tio, Jr. and started playing professionally in 1920.

He worked in Chicago and Milwaukee, Wisconsin, with various bands, including Jimmy Bell's Band and Charlie Elgar's Creole Orchestra.

Starting in 1926, he began playing with Jelly Roll Morton, and made a well regarded series of recordings with Morton's Red Hot Peppers and smaller groups. Simeon also taught music. In 1927, he joined King Oliver's Dixie Syncopators with whom he moved to New York City. After time back in Chicago with Elgar, he joined the Luis Russell in Manhattan, then again returned to Chicago in 1928 to play with the Erskine Tate Orchestra. In 1931, he began a 10-year stint with Earl Hines.

In the 1940s, he worked in the bands of Coleman Hawkins and Jimmie Lunceford. After some recordings with Kid Ory's band, he spent most of the 1950s with the Wilbur de Paris band, including a tour of Africa in 1957. In 1954, he played saxophone in a duet with Louis Armstrong on trumpet in Armstrong's popular Dixieland recording of "Skokiaan."

Omer Simeon died of throat cancer in New York City at the age of 57.

References

1902 births
1959 deaths
20th-century American male musicians
20th-century American saxophonists
African-American saxophonists
American jazz clarinetists
American jazz saxophonists
American male saxophonists
Bass clarinetists
Deaths from cancer in New York (state)
Deaths from esophageal cancer
Dixieland clarinetists
Dixieland saxophonists
Jazz musicians from New Orleans
Louisiana Creole people
American male jazz musicians
Red Hot Peppers members
Swing clarinetists
Swing saxophonists
20th-century African-American musicians